George Bouzianis (November 8, 1885 – October 23, 1959) was a major Greek expressionist painter.

Biography

He studied painting at the Athens School of Fine Arts with teachers such as Nikiphoros Lytras and Konstantinos Volanakis, Georgios Roilos and Dimitrios Geraniotis. In 1907 he moved to Munich to continue his art studies with Otto Seitz. In 1910 he moved to Berlin, where he was taught from Max Liebermann. In 1917 he has already adopted elements of German expressionism movement in his own individual artistic style. He became very soon a respected artist in Germany and very soon he had his first contract with the Barhfeld gallery. In 1927 in Chemnitz there was a large exhibition of his work. Between 1929 and 1932 he travelled and lived in Paris with the financial support of the Barhfeld gallery. Due to the financial crisis across Europe he had to return to Eichenau near Munich, where he had built a house. Unfortunately, expressionism was gradually fading away in Germany with the rise of nazism in Germany's politics.

In 1934 he returned to Greece. To his own disappointment he failed to take a position at the School of Fine Arts of Athens. Initially, Bouzianis was treated  with hostility from the Athenian artistic circles who started to appreciate his oeuvre after his exhibition at Parnassos gallery in 1949.

In 1950 he represented Greece at the Venice Biennale and in 1952 he was awarded with the first award of the Guggenheim competition for Greece.

His house after his death in Dafni, Attica has been converted to a museum. His paintings are today exhibited at the National Gallery of Athens and in many other museums in Greece and abroad.

See also 
 Art in modern Greece
 National Gallery of Greece

References

External links 
  Works in the private collection of Yiannis Skepetzakis
 Bouzianis works pics
 National Gallery of Greece
 Archived website by Anna Zinonos, devoted to Georgios Bouzianis, with material from official bibliography sources, 2008
 Article on Georgios Bouzianis in Eichenau near Munich
 Article on Georgios Bouzianis, auction of a paiinting in 2008
 Collection of artworks chronologically in order

Greek artists
1959 deaths
1885 births
20th-century Greek painters
Artists from Athens